Gaston Mervale (1882–1934) was an Australian director and actor who worked extensively on stage and in films. He directed several films for the Australian Life Biograph Company. After this wound up he went to New York and worked as an actor for several years. He returned to Australia in 1917 to produce plays.

Partial filmography as director
One Hundred Years Ago (1911)
A Ticket in Tatts (1911)
The Colleen Bawn (1911)
A Tale of the Australian Bush (1911)
Hands Across the Sea (1912)
A Daughter of Australia (1912)
Conn, the Shaughraun (1912)
The Wreck of the Dunbar or The Yeoman's Wedding (1912)
The Ticket of Leave Man (1912)
The Stubbornness of Geraldine (1915)

References

Veronica Kelly, "Australia's Svengali: Gaston Mervale in Theatre and Film", Australasian Drama Studies, 58, Apr 2011, 107-125

External links
 
 Gaston Mervale at National Film and Sound Archive
Gaston Mervale Australian theatre credits at AusStage
 

1910s in Australian cinema
Australian film directors
Australian male film actors
1882 births
1934 deaths
20th-century Australian male actors